Carlo Calani (died 1812)  was an Italian painter and sculptor, active in Parma in the late 18th century.

He painted the main altarpiece for the church of Colorno, the statue of St Anthony of Parma, and helped decorate with forty caryatids the great neoclassic hall (Hall of the Caryatids) in the Royal Palace of Milan.
Francesco Corneliani was one of his pupils.

Sources

1812 deaths
Artists from Parma
18th-century Italian sculptors
Italian male sculptors
19th-century Italian sculptors
18th-century Italian painters
Italian male painters
19th-century Italian painters
Painters from Parma
19th-century Italian male artists
18th-century Italian male artists